Nicholas de Moels or Nicholas Molis (born c. 1195 - died 1268 or 1269) of North Cadbury in Somerset, was an AngloNorman royal administrator and household knight of King Henry III. In this capacity he was assigned many and varied offices and duties, often of a temporary nature. He married a wealthy heiress which transformed him into a major landholder and feudal baron. In 1244 whilst serving as Seneschal of Gascony, he inflicted a defeat on the King of Navarre whom he took prisoner in the field.

Origins
His parentage is unknown. His surname appears to derive from the Norman manor of Meulles in Calvados, southwest of Orbec, in the Diocese of Lisieux. Devonshire historian Tristram Risdon (d. 1640) stated that he "descended of an ancient lineage in this shire" but provided no further detail. One of the many tenants of Devonshire baron Baldwin de Meulles (died 1090), a Domesday Book tenant in chief, was a certain "Roger de Moles", who held from him at least the two manors or estates of Lew Trenchard and Waddlescot / Warson. His successor in 1066 was a Joel de Moels. In 1242, as recorded in the Book of Fees, Lew Trenchard and Waddlescot were held by a certain "John de Molis" from John de Courtenay, feudal baron of Okehampton, who had inherited much of the land formerly held by Baldwin de Meulles. This John de Molis, perhaps a brother of Nicholas, would also hold Lashbrook, Dornaford, Exbourn and Highampton, which had been held by a Roger de Molis in 1086.

Nicholas was born about 1195 and appears to have spent some of his early life in the court of King John (11991216), whose son King Henry III (12161272) he would later serve.

Career
He served as Sheriff of Hampshire (1228–1232), Sheriff of Devon (1234), and Sheriff of Yorkshire (1239–1242); also as Constable of Winchester Castle, Pembroke Castle, Haverfordwest Castle, Cilgerran Castle, Tenby Castle, Rochester Castle (1247), Canterbury Castle (1247) and Corfe Castle. He was also Governor of the Channel Islands.

Seneschal of Gascony

Matthew Paris wrote as follows concerning events in 1243:
Unde cito post contigit quod cum rex a Burdegali recessurus custodemque quem senescallum vocant, ei idoneum, videlicet Nicholaum de Molis, providisset, jam jamque omnia ad custodiam terrae provide pro curasset, et ascensa nave, alta freti velificando versus Angliam jam sulcasset orta excogitati scismatis inter ipsos Wasconienses occasione rex missis galeis festinanter revocaretur et redire cogeretur ut exortus gravissimus conflictus ibidem sedaretur.

Which may be translated as follows:
"And it happened soon after, that when the king was about to leave Bordeaux, and had appointed Nicholas de Molis as a fit person to act as governor, whom they call seneschal, and had taken all precautions for the safety of the land, and had embarked, and was even ploughing the depths of the sea, sailing towards England, a furious quarrel having arisen among those Gascons, the king was hastily recalled by galleys sent after him, and compelled to return, that he might quell the great disturbance which had arisen".

In September 1243 King Henry III left Gascony to return to England, having on 17 June 1243 appointed Nicholas de Moels as Seneschal of Gascony, as is related by Matthew Paris in his Chronica Majora, with a marginal illustration of the King and Queen on board a ship with a man in a small boat alongside, apparently de Moels seeing him off. The Latin text following the illustration is as follows:
De reditu regis in Angliam de Pictavia et Wasconia. Eisdem quoque temporibus, scilicet circa festum Sancti Remigii, rex Angliae, dispositis in Wasconia disponendis commissaque custodia terrae Nicholao de Molis, militi strenuissimo et circumspecto, quem praefecit Wasconiae senescallum, naves ascendens, prospere velificando redeundo in Angliam, transfretavit et septimo kalendas octobris apud Portesmues applicuit.
Translated as:
"At that time also, namely about the feast of StRemy, the King of England, having settled what was to be settled in Gascony, and having intrusted the government of the land to Nicholas de Molis, a very brave and prudent soldier, whom he created seneschal of Gascony, and taking ship, had a most pleasant voyage across the Channel, and returned into England; he landed at Portsmouth on the 25th of September".

In 1244 in Gascony de Moels inflicted a defeat on the King of Navarre, capturing him in person on the battlefield, according to the Devonshire historian Tristram Risdon (d. 1640). He was relieved of that office, with commendation for his service, in July 1245.

The event is related as follows by Matthew Paris:
Nicholaus de Moles senescallus Wasconiae contra regem Navariae dimicans ad votum triumphavit: Anni ipsius eodem tempore Nicholaus de Molis Wasconiae senescallus quem rex a Wasconia ibidem terrae suae custodem constituerat contra regem Navariae guerram viriliter continuans ad votum in quodam casu inito certamine triumphavit.

Which may be translated:
"Of the victory gained by Nicholas de Molis, seneschal of Gascony. About this time of the year, Nicholas de Molis, seneschal of Gascony, whom the king, on leaving that country, had appointed governor of that province, and who had been carrying on a fierce war against the king of Navarre, was favoured by fortune in one engagement, and gained a victory over him".

Return to England
He returned to England to fight in the Welsh wars and was made governor of Caernarvon Castle and Cardigan Castle. In 1246 he was made Constable of Dover Castle, Sheriff of Kent in 1247 and Lord Warden of the Cinque Ports in 1258.

Landholdings
Many of the gifts of land he received from the king were temporary in nature, comprising lands forfeited by other landholders but later restored to them. In 1217 he was granted a lease of the manor of Watlington in Oxfordshire, "for his sustenance in the king's service". In 1226 he was granted Little Berkhamstead, which was later confirmed to him in fee. After his marriage in 1230 to Hawise de Newmarch, heiress of North Cadbury and many other manors, he became a major landholder in his own right. He continued to receive royal grants. In 1230 he was granted the royal demesne manors of King's Carswell and Diptford in Devon. In 1250/1 he was granted free warren in his manors of Cadbury and nearby Mapperton in Dorset.

Personal life
In or after 1230 he married (as her second husband), Hawise de Newmarch, widow of John de Botreaux (whom she had married in 1218) and younger daughter & coheiress of James de Newmarch (d. 1216), feudal baron of North Cadbury in Somerset. The other sister Isabel de Newmarch, married Ralph Russell (died c. 1250), son of her guardian Sir John Russell (died c. 1224) of Kingston Russell in Dorset, also a household knight of King John and of the young King Henry III to whom he also acted as steward.

By Hawise he had children including:
 James de Moels (d. March 1252/3), eldest son and heir apparent who predeceased his father. In 1243 he was assigned to be educated with Prince Edward, son of King Henry III.
 Roger de Moels (c. 1233/71294), 2nd but eldest surviving son and heir, Marshal of the Army and Governor of Lampsdervour Castle in Ceredigion. His second son was John de Moels, 1st Baron Moels (d. 1310).
 Agnes de Moels (born 1230), born at Cadbury, the second wife of William de Braose, 1st Baron Braose, feudal baron of Bramber and Gower.
 Maud de Moels (born c. 1258), married Richard de L'Orti, or de Urtiaco, heir to the barony of Stoke Trister, Somerset.

Nicholas de Moels died between November 1268 and 24 June 1269.

Footnotes

References

Bibliography

Books and journals

Web

 
 

Moels, Nicholas de
Moels, Nicholas de
Moels, Nicholas de
Moels, Nicholas de
13th-century English Navy personnel
High Sheriffs of Hampshire
High Sheriffs of Yorkshire
High Sheriffs of Kent
High Sheriffs of Devon